PDP London is an architectural practice based in the UK.  Founded in 1994, Chairman Paul Davis, retired from the practice as chairman in 2013, with the other 10 partners continuing to lead. Its head office is at Eccleston Yards, London; in recent years it has expanded, opening an office in Hong Kong, in 2011, and offices in Bath and Madrid in 2018.

It has been in the Architects' Journal AJ 100 list of the top 100 UK practices, in 2012 winning the awards for Practice of the Year, and Sustainable Practice of the Year, whilst also being highly commended in the categories for Fastest Growing Practice and International Practice of the Year.

Notable projects 

Cambridge House, formerly premises of the In and Out Club, London
3-10 Grosvenor Crescent, London
Park Lane for the Dorchester Collection, London
Code 5 Housing Project, Carryduff,  Belfast
100 Princedale Road, London
Duke of York Square, London
The Westminster Terrace, Hong Kong
Saatchi Gallery, London
Cadogan Hall, London
St George's Church Tufnell Park, London

Sustainability 

The practice has a close collaboration with Eight Associates who focus on the delivery of BREEAM accredited sustainable buildings.

In 2010 PDP London completed work on the refurbishment of a social housing project (100 Princedale Road), to Passivhaus standards, reducing CO2 emissions by 83% and using 94% less energy. Described by the founder of Passivhaus as "one of the most advanced worldwide"; it won the award for best small housing project at the AJ Retrofit awards 2012.

References

External links 
 

Architecture firms based in London